The Lancia d'Oro was a men's professional golf tournament held in Italy from 1962 to 1976. It was hosted at Golf Club Biella every year except for 1974, which was hosted by Turin Golf Club, during the club's 50th anniversary year. Generally it was a limited-field invitation event but the 1972 tournament was a full-field event, and was part of what would later be recognised as the inaugural European Tour season.

History
The 1972 event was played from 19 to 22 October. The prize money was £10,000 with a first prize of £1,700. José María Cañizares led after each of the first three rounds with scores of 69, 70 and 75. However, after a final round 73 he was tied with Peter Townsend on 287. Cañizares won the playoff at the fifth extra hole with a birdie 3, after hitting a 4-iron to 2 feet from the hole.

Having not been played in 1975, the Lancia d'Oro returned in 1976 as a four man team match play event. It was won by the United States team of Tommy Aaron, George Burns, Billy Casper, and Lee Elder who defeated the European team of Seve Ballesteros, Baldovino Dassù, Eamonn Darcy and Tony Jacklin.

Winners

Notes

References

External links
Coverage on the Golf Club Biella official site

Golf tournaments in Italy
Recurring sporting events established in 1962
Recurring sporting events disestablished in 1976
Magnano